is a Japanese voice actor and singer affiliated with 81 Produce. He is known for his roles as Jiro Yamashita in The Idolmaster: SideM and Yoshifumi Nitta in Hinamatsuri.

In addition to voice acting, Nakajima is also a member of UMake  with fellow voice actor Kent Itō. He also provides vocals and guitar to the band Sir Vanity, a band he formed with Yuichiro Umehara and two other musicians.

Biography
Nakajima was born in Kanagawa Prefecture on June 26, 1993. He studied at the Voice Actor Department of Yoyogi Animation School in Yokohama. After graduating, he joined the vocal training school of agency 81 Produce. After the training period, in April 2012, he formally became affiliated with 81 Produce. In 2018, he performed the song , which is used as the ending theme to the anime series Hinamatsuri, where he played the series' protagonist Yoshifumi Nitta. He also played the role of Makoto in the 2018 anime television series Ingress.

On July 22, 2021, Nakajima tested positive for COVID-19.

Filmography

Television animation

Theatrical animation

Tokusatsu

Video games
2012
E.X. Troopers – Academia

2015
White Cat Project – Zack 
The Idolmaster: Side M – Jiro Yamashita
Ensemble Stars! – Tetora Nagumo 

2016

Soul Reverse Zero – Oda Nobunaga, Theseus
Dynamic Chord – Yuki Aoi
Dragon Quest: Monster Battle Scanner – Mikeman Yoshiki

Magical Days the Brats Parade – Jin

2019
BlackStar - Theatre Starless –Rindou
Hero's Park – Mashiba Tomoki

2020
Dragalia Lost – Joachim

Dubbing
All of Us Are Dead, Lee Su-hyeok (Park Solomon)
ZeroZeroZero, Stefano La Piana (Giuseppe De Domenico)

References

External links
Official agency profile 

1993 births
Living people
Japanese male video game actors
Japanese male voice actors
Male voice actors from Yokohama
81 Produce voice actors